Goose Bay may refer to: 

 Happy Valley-Goose Bay, a town in Newfoundland and Labrador, Canada
 CFB Goose Bay, a Canadian Forces Base located in Happy Valley-Goose Bay
 Goose Bay (Newfoundland and Labrador), a natural bay off the island of Newfoundland in Newfoundland and Labrador, Canada
 Goose Bay, New Zealand, a coastal settlement south of Kaikoura, New Zealand
 , ship
 Goose Bay Airport (Alaska), an airport near Anchorage, Alaska